Sammy Wilk (born Samuel Howard Wilkinson; December 11, 1995) is an American internet personality, singer-songwriter and entrepreneur. Born and raised in Omaha, Nebraska, Wilk lived with his parents (Lori and Dave Wilkinson) and siblings (Annie, Emily and Benny Wilkinson). Sammy’s sister, Emily, is married to Cleveland Browns quarterback Baker Mayfield. Wilk has since moved to Los Angeles, California. He developed a following on social media platform Vine in 2013, often working with acts such as Jack & Jack, Nash Grier, and others.

Career

Social media 
Wilk initially began his career in 2013 by collaborating on early Vine videos with Jack & Jack. He later joined them onboard the MAGCON tour in 2014 (Nash Grier, Cameron Dallas, Matt Espinosa, Shawn Mendes, Mahogany Lox, Taylor Caniff, Aaron Carpenter, Carter Reynolds, Jack Johnson, and Jack Gilinsky).

He's now currently amassed more than 1.7 million followers on Instagram, and nearly a million on Twitter

Music

Sammy and Skate
In 2014, Wilk began releasing music alongside Omaha-based artist Skate Maloley under the alias Sammy & Skate.

Solo career
In July 2015, Wilk released the music video for his pop-reggae single Aye Ma. The video garnered support from the likes of Nash Grier, Jack Johnson, and others. Wilk had hinted at the release of his debut EP, said to come out in December 2015, but it was announced that it was pushed back to sometime in 2016.

Wilk released his debut album, "Ready For War" on April 22, 2016. He released the title track video along with his hit single, Light Up featuring Ky-Mani Marley.  In 2017, Wilk released singles Issues, Doesn't Make Sense, Let It Go, Way Up and Public Figure featuring Derek Luh.  Wilk joined Derek Luh on the "Almost Broke" North American Tour in late 2017.

As an entrepreneur, Wilk also launched his clothing line, WILK Collection (exclusively sold on the website and pop-up shops), which features hats, hoodies, t-shirts and more. In addition, Wilk also created the WILK Project to help raise money and awareness for the children in Sierra Leone, Africa to build music and art programs.

Discography

Singles

As lead artist

As Sammy and Skate

Collaborations

Music videos

References

External links
Official website

1995 births
Living people
American singer-songwriters
21st-century American singers